Kika Edgar (born January 9) is a Mexican actress and singer.

Biography 
Sandra Erika Edgar Garza was born in Ciudad Madero, Tamaulipas, Mexico. Beginning her career primarily in theater and musicals, she has become well known in Mexico, starring in telenovelas such as Amor Real and Contra Viento y Marea. She began her singing career in 2006 after her appearance in the Mexican reality show Cantando por un Sueño. Since then, Kika has released five solo albums, and has been called La Nueva Gran Intérprete de México ("The New Great Performer of Mexico").

Early career 
Edgar began her career by studying acting and singing at the Centro de Educación Artística de Televisa (CEA). She specialized in ballet dancing, as she aspired to become a professional artist.

Television career

Albums 
 Cantando Por Un Sueño (2006) (Duets with her Cantando por un Sueño partner Raul Juárez)
 Kika (2007)
 Lo Siento mi Amor (2008) (Tribute album to legendary Mexican singer Lupita D'Alessio)
 Señor Amante (2009)
 Broadway (2011)
 Nuevas Canciones (2016)
 Colección de Antaño (2021)

References

External links

Mexican television actresses
Living people
21st-century Mexican singers
21st-century Mexican women singers
1985 births